Sinezona is a genus of minute sea snails, marine gastropod mollusks or micromollusks in the family Scissurellidae, the little slit shells.

Description
The shell has turbinate or depressed turbinate form. The anal fissure is closed, forming a foramen in the outer wall of the aperture. The
slit fasciole is shorter, not over 1½ whorls in length.

Sinezona is a Scissurella in which the anal slit becomes closed in the adult, and transformed into an oblong perforation like one of the holes of a Haliotis.

Distribution
This marine genus occurs worldwide.

Species
Species in the genus Sinezona include:

 Sinezona bandeli Marshall, 2002
 Sinezona beddomei  (Petterd, 1884)
 Sinezona brevis (Hedley, 1904)
 Sinezona brucei Geiger, 2012
 Sinezona calumnior Geiger, 2012
 Sinezona carolarum Geiger & McLean, 2010
 Sinezona chilensis Geiger, 2012
 Sinezona cingulata (O.G. Costa, 1861)
 Sinezona confusa Rolán & Luque, 1994
 Sinezona costulata Geiger & Sasaki, 2009
 Sinezona danieldreieri Geiger, 2008
 Sinezona doliolum  Herbert, 1986
 Sinezona enigmatica Geiger & B.A. Marshall, 2012
 Sinezona ferriezi (Crosse, 1867)
 Sinezona finlayi (Laws, 1948)
 Sinezona garciai Geiger, 2006
 † Sinezona geigeri Landau, Van Dingenen & Ceulemans, 2017 
 Sinezona globosa Geiger, 2006
 † Sinezona haliotimorpha Lozouet, 1998 
 Sinezona hawaiiensis Geiger & McLean, 2010
 Sinezona insignis (E.A. Smith, 1910)
 Sinezona insularis Simone, 2009
 Sinezona iota (Finlay, 1926)
 Sinezona kayae Geiger & McLean, 2010
 † Sinezona kondoi 
 † Sinezona koruahina (Laws, 1936) 
 Sinezona laqueus (Finlay, 1926)
 Sinezona levigata (Iredale, 1908)
 Sinezona macleani Geiger, 2006
 Sinezona marrowi Geiger, 2012
 Sinezona mechanica Geiger & B.A. Marshall, 2012
 Sinezona milleri Geiger & Sasaki, 2009
 Sinezona mouchezi (Vélain, 1876)
 Sinezona norfolkensis Geiger, 2012
 Sinezona pacifica (Oliver, 1915)
 Sinezona pauperata (Powell, 1933)
 Sinezona platyspira Geiger & B.A. Marshall, 2012
 Sinezona plicata  (Hedley, 1899)
 † Sinezona praecedens Lozouet, 1998 
 Sinezona rimuloides (Carpenter, 1865) - rim scissurelle
 Sinezona semicostata  Burnay & Rolán, 1990
 Sinezona singeri Geiger, 2006
 Sinezona singulata (O. G Costa)
 Sinezona subantarctica (Hedley, 1916)
 † Sinezona tertia (Laws, 1940) 
 Sinezona wanganellica Geiger & B.A. Marshall, 2012
 Sinezona wileyi Geiger, 2008
 Sinezona zimmeri Geiger, 2003

Nomine dubia
 Sinezona concinna (G. B. Sowerby I, 1831)
 Sinezona miranda (A. Adams, 1862)
 Sinezona modesta (A. Adams, 1862)
 Sinezona paumotuensis (Garrett, 1872)
Species brought into synonymy
 Sinezona armillata Yaron, 1983: synonym of Sukashitrochus armillatus (Yaron, 1983)
 Sinezona atkinsoni Tenison-Woods, J.E., 1877: synonym of Sukashitrochus atkinsoni (Tenison Woods, 1877)
 Sinezona brasiliensis Mattar, 1987: synonym of Satondella brasiliensis (Mattar, 1987)
 Sinezona carinata (Adams, A., 1862): synonym of Sukashitrochus carinatus (A. Adams, 1862)
 Sinezona crossei (Folin, L. de, 1869): synonym of Sinezona cingulata (O. G. Costa, 1861)
 Sinezona fayalensis (Dautzenberg, 1889): synonym of Sinezona cingulata (O. G. Costa, 1861)
 Sinezona lobini Burnay & Rolán, 1990: synonym of Scissurella lobini (Burnay & Rolan, 1990)
 Sinezona morleti (Crosse, 1880): synonym of Sukashitrochus morleti (Crosse, 1880)
 Sinezona lyallensis (Finlay, 1927): synonym of Sukashitrochus lyallensis (Finlay, 1926)
 Sinezona padangensis (Thiele, 1912): synonym of Sinezona ferriezi (Crosse, 1867)
 Sinezona pulchra (Petterd, 1884): synonym of Sukashitrochus pulcher (Petterd, 1884)
 Sinezona redferni Rolán, 1996: synonym of Scissurella redferni (Rolán, 1996)
 Sinezona tricarinata Yaron, 1983: synonym of Sukashitrochus tricarinatus (Yaron, 1983)

References

 Geiger D.L. (2003). Phylogenetic assessment of characters proposed for the generic classification of Recent Scissurellidae (Gastropoda: Vetigastropoda) with a description of one new genus and six new species frop Easter Island and Australia. Molluscan Research 23:21-83
 Geiger D.L. (2012) Monograph of the little slit shells. Volume 1. Introduction, Scissurellidae. pp. 1-728. Volume 2. Anatomidae, Larocheidae, Depressizonidae, Sutilizonidae, Temnocinclidae. pp. 729–1291. Santa Barbara Museum of Natural History Monographs Number 7

External links 
 DiscoverLife
 ZipCodeZoo

Scissurellidae
Extant Miocene first appearances
Taxa named by Harold John Finlay